James Soong Chu-yu (born 16 March 1942) is a Taiwanese politician. He is the founder and current Chairman of the People First Party.

Born to a Kuomintang military family of Hunanese origin, Soong began his political career as a secretary to Premier Chiang Ching-kuo  (later president) and rose to prominence as director-general of the Government Information Office (GIO) from 1979 to 1984. Upon Chiang's death, Soong was instrumental in silencing conservatives in the KMT from blocking the ascendancy of Lee Teng-hui as KMT leader. Soong was the only elected governor of Taiwan Province from 1994 to 1998, before the streamlining of the provincial government. He placed second in the 2000 presidential election; his independent candidacy split the pro-Chinese unification vote between himself and the KMT candidate Lien Chan, leading to the ascendancy of Democratic Progressive Party candidate Chen Shui-bian. In the 2004 presidential election, he ran as vice president on the ticket of Kuomintang chairman Lien Chan; they narrowly lost to Chen Shui-bian. Soong ran again as a candidate in the 2012 presidential race, garnering 2.77% of popular support. Soong's third presidential campaign in 2016 formed a split ticket with Minkuotang chairwoman Hsu Hsin-ying and won 12.84% of the vote.  His 2020 campaign with running mate Sandra Yu finished last, with 4.2% of the vote. As of 2022, his name appears in the Suisse secrets revelations.

Early life and education 
Soong was born in Xiangtan, Hunan province. His father, was a career military officer staunchly loyal to Republic of China (ROC) President Chiang Kai-shek and rose to the rank of Major General in the Nationalist Army from an enlisted sailor. With the Nationalist defeat in the Chinese Civil War, the family fled to Taiwan in 1949. He earned his bachelor's degree in diplomacy from National Chengchi University in 1964.

Soong travelled to the United States for graduate school and received an M.A. in political science from the University of California, Berkeley in 1967 and an M.S. in library science from The Catholic University of America in 1971. He earned a Ph.D. in political science from Georgetown University in 1974.

While at Berkeley, Soong met his future wife Viola Chen. They later had a son and a daughter.

Career
As he was finishing his doctoral studies, he was recommended by GIO Director Fredrick Chien to be the English secretary of then-Premier Chiang Ching-kuo. Soong served as Secretary to Premier from 1974–1977 and with Chiang Ching-kuo's accession to the presidency, the Personal Secretary to the President from 1978–1981 and 1984-1989. Soong gained his public fame when he addressed the nation following the Carter administration's decision to break ties with the ROC in order to switch diplomatic ties to the People's Republic of China on December 16, 1978 in which he gave a patriotic condemnation of the American position and a ringing defense of the ROC.

Soon afterwards, President Chiang promoted Soong to become the youngest Director-General of the GIO, in which he served from 1979 to 1984.

Rise of Lee Teng-hui
Upon Chiang Ching-kuo's death in 1988, Soong was seen as instrumental in consolidating the power of the new president, Lee Teng-hui. Soong was part of the Palace Faction that included Chiang loyalists such as Hau Pei-tsun and Lee Huan and which sought to limit Lee Teng-hui and his native Taiwanese faction's role in the government. During the KMT's central standing committee on the day of Chiang's funeral, when the Palace Faction sought to delay Lee's accession to the party Chairmanship, Soong unexpectedly made an impassioned plea in favour of Lee, declaring that "Each day of delay is a day of disrespect to Ching-kuo." He also made a veiled criticism of Soong Mei-ling (no relation), implying that she had returned to Taiwan after her stepson's death to try to reassume power.

Soong established himself as one of the few mainlanders who were also loyal to Lee. In support of Soong, Lee coined the term "New Taiwanese" to describe a person born in mainland China, raised in Taiwan, who calls Taiwan home. Lee moved swiftly to promote Soong to KMT Secretary-General, a position Soong held from 1989 to 1993. In 1993, Lee appointed him Governor of Taiwan Province.

In June 1993, Soong opened a Credit Suisse account, three months after he had stepped down as KMT secretary-general, and it closed in 2010. In 2007 he held over 13 million Swiss francs in it, which is incompatible by his official salary as a public servant. The account is one of a number of things which have led to implications of his involvement in the Taiwan frigate scandal.

Governorship: 1994–98 
In 1994 Soong was elected and became the only directly elected Governor of Taiwan Province. He was widely perceived to be an excellent campaigner and his excellent showing in the governorship ended hopes by the DPP of a "Yeltsin effect", by which an elected governor would have more legitimacy than the national government, due to the President being still elected by the National Assembly at that time.

Despite his Mainlander background, Soong proved to be a popular politician among all ethnic groups on Taiwan, in part because he was one of the first KMT politicians to attempt to speak in Taiwanese Hokkien in political and formal occasions.

After Premier Lien Chan was elected vice-president in 1996, the premiership was vacated in 1997 after the Judicial Yuan ruled out that the person could not serve both vice-president and premier. Soong felt that as Governor of Taiwan, he was the natural successor to Lien, but President Lee believed that Soong should serve out his term. President Lee appointed Vincent Siew, whom Soong considered a subordinate, and this act led to the split between Soong and Lee.

The position of Governor of Taiwan was eliminated in December 1998 following a National Development Council meeting in 1996, when it suggested that the administrative structure of the Taiwanese government be streamlined. Soong and his supporters believe this to have been a political move by President Lee to cut off Soong's power base, but proponents of the downsizing called it a pragmatic move to eliminate administrative redundancies. Soong tendered his resignation on December 31 of the same year, but President Lee did not accept it.

2000 presidential election
After losing the KMT presidential nomination to then-vice president Lien Chan, Soong ran as an independent in the 2000 Presidential elections. Soong advocated a gradual union between Taiwan and the mainland by first signing a non-aggression pact followed by the formation of a cross-strait union similar to the European Union. His platform called for the characterization of relations between the Mainland and Taiwan as neither foreign nor domestic. Although widely seen as the candidate most friendly to Mainland China, Soong took particular effort to counter the perception that he would "sell out" Taiwan.

The KMT responded by expelling Soong and his supporters from the party. In the final months leading to the 2000 elections, the KMT, then under Lee Teng-hui's leadership, sued Soong for theft, alleging that as party Secretary-General, he stole millions of Taiwan dollars in cash intended for the family of the late President Chiang Ching-kuo and hid the money in the Chunghsing Bills Finance Company. In defense he stated that the money in those bank accounts was in fact all from the KMT, and he insisted that the money transfer was authorized by then-KMT chairman, Lee Teng-hui. These statements have been substantiated by an internal KMT memo signed by Lee which were published by the court many years later.

The scandal hurt Soong's clean image. Initially leading in the polls, Soong narrowly lost the election with 36.84% of the vote to Chen Shui-bian of the Democratic Progressive Party with 39.3%. Lien came in a distant third with only 23.1%. One common belief from the pro-blue camp in Taiwan is that Lee Teng-hui favored the unpopular Vice President Lien Chan over the highly popular Soong in a deliberate effort to sabotage the Kuomintang and was secretly supporting Chen, despite the fact that Lee is supposed to favor Kuomintang's own nominee Lien. Some believe Lee feared Soong would expose the corruption in his administration, and undermine his legacy.

After losing the election, Soong's supporters protested in front of the KMT party headquarters and blockaded the building for a few days. They succeeded in pressuring Lee Teng-hui to resign as KMT Chairman in favor of Lien Chan. Within weeks, Soong and his supporters formed the People First Party (PFP), considered a spin-off from the KMT.

Prosecutors later dropped all charges against Soong in the Chunghsing Scandal. In 2003, the investigation was reopened, with former President Lee (now expelled from the KMT and the "spiritual leader" of the pro-independence Taiwan Solidarity Union) testifying against Soong in court. However, with the KMT allied with the People First Party for the 2004 presidential election, the KMT aided Soong in his defense, providing documents signed by Lee. KMT Chairman Lien Chan claimed the KMT was misled into filing the lawsuit against Soong. The KMT dropped the charges and is still trying to collect the money that had been returned and was deposited in the court by Soong.

2004 presidential election 
Despite the personal rivalries between Lien, the KMT chairman after 2000, and Soong, the KMT and People First Party pledged to cooperate in future elections to prevent splitting the vote. Though losses in the 2001 legislative elections made the DPP the largest single party in the Legislative Yuan, the pan-blue coalition retained a narrow majority over the pan-green coalition.

Soong ran as vice presidential candidate under Lien Chan in the 2004 elections. Some believe that the PFP's lack of experienced candidates in the December 2002 mayoral elections in Taipei and Kaohsiung (the PFP supported the KMT's candidates), and the PFP's poor performance the city council elections in those cities at the same time were major setbacks to Soong's chances of being the KMT-PFP candidate for president. There were widespread rumours that Soong agreed to take the Vice-Presidential post in exchange for a pledge by Lien to give him significant power including the Premiership. Many KMT members opposed the linkage as they considered Soong an opportunist and traitor. Soong's supporters pointed out that he was more popular than Lien, as consistently demonstrated by polls, and the results of the 2000 presidential elections. Though both men garnered a combined 60% of the vote in 2000 (compared to Chen's 39%) they lost to Chen in 2004 by a mere 0.22% of the vote and never conceded.

2005 
After the 2004 Presidential election, Soong actively sought the merger of the KMT and People First Party. However, he ceased doing so after the ROC Legislative Election, 2004. Although the pan-blue coalition did well, the PFP did not, and Soong ended talk of a KMT-PFP merger. In February 2005, he signed a 10 point consensus program with President Chen Shui-Bian which brought heavy criticism to Chen. The possibility of DPP-PFP cooperation ended in May 2005, when Soong visited mainland China to meet with General Secretary Hu Jintao of the Chinese Communist Party. Initially, Chen stated that Soong was to deliver a secret message to the PRC leadership, but Soong denied this.

In the 2005 KMT chairmanship election, Soong, who retained a significant following within the KMT, despite initially instructing party officials not to support either Ma Ying-jeou or Wang Jin-pyng, endorsed Wang at the last minute. The endorsement appeared to backfire, however, as Ma defeated Wang by a large margin of 72% to 28%. On July 22, 2005, Soong, unopposed, was re-elected chairman of the PFP.

On November 17, 2005, Soong was awarded NT$10 million in a defamation suit against former President Lee Teng-hui, who had alleged that Soong was playing mahjong while his supporters were protesting on the streets in April 2004. A three-judge panel of the Taipei District Court ruled that Lee must apologize and compensate Soong, saying that Lee's "groundless" remark had damaged Soong's reputation. In addition, the court ordered Lee to publish a half-page apology in major newspapers for three consecutive days.

Soong's visit to mainland China followed quickly on the heels of the trail-blazing visit of KMT Chairman Lien Chan. Beyond a sentimental visit, the important political aspect of his tour came from his visit to Beijing. There, he shook hands with Hu Jintao, General Secretary of the Chinese Communist Party, and exchanged presents with him; Soong gave Hu a work of glass art from Liuli Gongfang, and received a piece of Jingdezhen porcelain from Hu. Soong was only the second major political figure from Taiwan to ever do so. The carefully scripted red-carpet ceremony was identical to the previous greeting for KMT Chairman Lien Chan. The key outcome of the meeting was the publication of a shared political platform between the Communist Party and Soong's People's First Party. Finally, Soong lectured at Tsinghua University, an echo of Lien's lecture at Peking University four weeks prior.

Soong's visit was designed to emphasize his belief in the common shared roots of the Chinese people, a reflection of his pro-unification sentiment. He specifically chose to honor the historical ancestor of the Chinese people, the contemporary father of the Republic of China, and then his own direct ancestors in that precise order. His public comments addressed this continuous theme as well, receiving rapturous support from his mainland audience. The political consensus borne of the visit between the PFP and the CPC called for practical actions towards establishing links between Taiwan and mainland China, while firmly resisting Taiwanese independence.

2006 Taipei mayoral election

Tax issue
On August 17, 2006, Taiwan's Administrative Supreme Court handed down a ruling against Soong in a case of tax evasion. He was charged gift taxes by the National Tax Administration from events in 1994 when he wired NT$42 million from his election campaign account to that of his daughter-in-law in the United States.  Soong's argument was that he had wired the money to his daughter-in-law in order to pay off remaining campaign debts and to establish a Foundation, and that he was not simply "gifting" the money to her. The Court however found that the first money was not given to the Foundation until December 2001, and ruled that the money had been used as his private assets and that therefore gift tax was payable. He was assessed NT$13 million in gift tax, with fine also of NT$13 million, for a total sum of NT$26 million.

Taipei campaign
On October 18, 2006, Soong formally announced and registered his candidacy for the Mayoralty of Taipei City, Taiwan's capital and largest city, in the local government elections to be held in December 2006. Soong registered as a "non-partisan" candidate without a party affiliation, declaring that he had taken a leave of absence from his post as Chairman of the PFP.

After his defeat in Taipei Mayoral Election on the 9th of December, 2006, he won only 4% of cast ballots, James Soong announced that he will retire from politics, which entailed giving up the chairmanship of his party, the PFP. With this announcement and with no clear goal, the PFP face an uncertain future which could speed up any merger with the Kuomintang.

Claims made by former president Chen Shui-bian

Chen Shui-bian claimed in an interview with a cable TV channel in May 2005 that Soong met Chen Yunlin in the United States in February that year.

Following this claim, on February 15, 2007 Taipei District Court ruled Thursday that President Chen Shui-bian must pay James Soong NT$3 million (US$91,183) in damages and apologize in the top three newspapers for his allegation that Soong met secretly with China's State Council Taiwan Affairs Office Director Chen Yunlin in 2005. The court said President Chen failed to carry out necessary verification before making his allegation. "The president exercises overall control over the executive sector resources and his responsibility to verify information must be weighted," a court spokesman said.

PFP spokesman Lee Hung-Chun called the judgment "comforting" but said that it had come too late. "It took more than a year for the first judgment to come out," he said, adding that this meant the public did not get the chance to learn the truth during a time when the political situation was changing rapidly. Chen's counsel said that he would appeal to the High Court.

Claiming that his remarks were based on "intelligence", Chen also said Soong promised during the meeting to oppose a proposed constitutional amendment that would allow for popular referendums on future constitutional amendments, in exchange for Beijing's approval for Soong to visit China.

Soong filed a defamation suit against Chen in June 2005, demanding a symbolic NT$1 in compensation and a published apology in four major local newspapers for three consecutive days. After Chen repeated his claim in another TV interview in October that same year. Soong later extended his compensation demand to NT$50 million and asked Chen to publish an apology in four internationally famous newspapers in the United States, the United Kingdom, France, and Japan, as well as in three local ones.

According to the written judgment, Chen said that the intelligence about Soong's activity was submitted to him by Bureau of Investigation Director-General Yeh Cherng-maw. However, Yeh told the court that he had warned Chen that the intelligence, some of which he admitted was drawn from media speculation, was difficult to check.

The judgment said that as president, Chen must have understood the weakness of the information and could have ordered the national security system to conduct further verification, but decided not to bother.

2012 presidential election
After a petition, Soong, for the first time as a People First Party presidential candidate, ran the 2012 presidential election together with Lin Ruey-shiung, a National Taiwan University professor in public health. Soong described the "Blue-Green rivalry" in Taiwanese politics as an epidemic and stated that Lin, as a doctor, was his partner to cure this "disease". He contended that Taiwanese people wanted a third party other than the KMT and the DPP, and that the PFP was their choice.

2016 presidential election 
Soong announced his intention to join the 2016 Taiwan presidential election on 6 August 2015 with running mate Hsu Hsin-ying of the Minkuotang. The Soong–Hsu ticket finished third.

2020 presidential election 
Soong contested the 2020 Taiwan presidential election, beginning his campaign on 13 November 2019. He had promised that this campaign would be his last attempt for the presidency. Soong and Sandra Yu formed the People First Party ticket.  The pair registered their candidacy with the Central Election Commission on 18 November 2019. Soong and Yu finished third in the presidential election, with 4.2% of the vote.

Notes

References

|-

|-

1942 births
Catholic University of America alumni
Chairpersons of the Taiwan Provincial Government
Georgetown University Law Center alumni
Independent presidential candidates of Taiwan
Kuomintang politicians in Taiwan
Leaders of political parties in Taiwan
Living people
National Chengchi University alumni
People First Party (Taiwan) presidential nominees
Politicians from Xiangtan
Republic of China politicians from Hunan
UC Berkeley College of Letters and Science alumni
Expelled members of the Kuomintang
Chinese Civil War refugees
Taiwanese people from Hunan
Senior Advisors to President Tsai Ing-wen